Sooyoung Park (born 1967) is an American and South Korean singer-songwriter, best known for fronting the bands Bitch Magnet and Seam. In 1995 he co-founded Foundation of Asian American Independent Media, an art festival dedicated to showcasing Asian American culture.

Early life 
Sooyoung Park was born in 1967 in upstate New York, but grew up in West Virginia and North Carolina. He graduated from Oberlin College, where he was a founding member of the band Bitch Magnet.

Discography

Bitch Magnet
Star Booty (1988, Glitterhouse)
Umber (1989, Glitterhouse)
Ben Hur (1990, Glitterhouse)

Seam
Headsparks (1991, Homestead Records)
The Problem With Me (1993, Touch and Go Records)
Are You Driving Me Crazy? (1995, Touch and Go Records)
The Pace Is Glacial (1998, Touch and Go Records)

Shady
"Narcotic Candy" single (1994, Beggars Banquet)

Ee
For 100 We Try Harder (2002, Asian Man Records)

Codeine
Frigid Stars LP (expanded re-issue 2012, Numero Group)

Bored Spies
Summer 720 7" single (2013, Damnably)

References 

1967 births
American male singers
American rock singers
American musicians of Korean descent
Living people
Oberlin College alumni